The Unsleeping Eye is a 1973 science fiction novel by British writer D. G. Compton. It was published in the United Kingdom as The Continuous Katherine Mortenhoe in 1974 and was filmed by Bertrand Tavernier in 1980 as Death Watch, starring Harvey Keitel, Romy Schneider and Max von Sydow. Subsequent editions of the novel were published as Death Watch.

The story is set in the near future, in a welfare state. A journalist is operated on so that what he sees is transmitted to a TV studio. He pursues a woman who is dying of an incurable disease, and provides viewers with voyeuristic images of her private anguish.

Theodore Sturgeon praised The Unsleeping Eye as a novel that "fulfills all of its extraordinary promise."

The book was republished under the original title of The Continuous Katherine Mortenhoe by New York Review Books in 2016 (ISBN 97781590179710) with an introduction by Jeff Vandermeer.

References

1973 British novels
1973 science fiction novels
British novels adapted into films
DAW Books books